Armoury Studios is a Canadian recording studio located in Vancouver, British Columbia's Kitsilano neighbourhood.

History

The Armoury building was constructed, from the ground up, in 1992 by Canadian songwriter/producer Jim Vallance. Vallance collaborated with architect Howard Airey on the building's design and engineer/producer and studio designer Ron Vermeulen (aka Ron Obvious) oversaw the technical and acoustical elements.

The studio was purchased from Vallance in 1995 by friend and producer Bruce Fairbairn, who produced music there with such artists as Chicago, The Cranberries, INXS, Kiss, The Harvest, and the Atomic Fireballs before he died in 1999 during the mixing of Yes' The Ladder.

Since 1999, the studio has been owned and privately operated by the Fairbairn family, serving a variety of local and international clients, including such artists as Elvis Costello, Nickelback, Seal, R.E.M., Bruno Mars, Hinder, Norah Jones, Nothingface, AC/DC, Tegan and Sara, Garbage, Stone Sour and Strapping Young Lad, among others.

Facilities

The studio features an SSL G+ Series 4072 console with Total Recall and E Series "black knob" EQ as well as ten Neve 1081 Preamp/EQ's and eight Neve 1073 Preamp/EQ's. Also available to clients is a host of vintage outboard equipment and microphones from top manufacturers including Neumann and AKG among others.

The studio facility and equipment was maintained by Technical Director John Vrtacic until his death in 2009.

Other facilities include upper and lower lounges, stone fireplace, a kitchen and a patio with a barbecue and a view of the Burrard Inlet and North Shore mountains.

External links
 
 Jim Vallance on the Armoury's construction

Recording studios in Canada
Buildings and structures in Vancouver
Music of Vancouver
Commercial buildings completed in 1992
1996 establishments in British Columbia